The 2001–02 Tunisian Ligue Professionnelle 1 season was the 76th season of top-tier football in Tunisia.

Results

League table

Result table

Source:

Leaders

References

Tunisian Ligue Professionnelle 1 seasons
1
Tun